The Balance of Competences Review was an “audit of what the EU does and how it affects the UK”, carried out by the United Kingdom Government during the Cameron–Clegg coalition. It was launched in 2012 and the set of reports were published in December 2014, but without a single summary final report.

References

David Cameron